Kodange is a small hamlet in Karkal taluka, Udupi district, Karnataka, India. It is near Manipal and about 8 km away from Udupi and 3 km from Parkala junction in Karnataka. Agriculture is the main occupation.

References 

 

Villages in Udupi district